R. A. Gunawardana was the 31st Surveyor General of Sri Lanka. He was appointed in 1971, succeeding C. Vanniasingam, and held the office until 1973. He was succeeded by A. M. Cumaraswamy.

References

G